Cedar Creek is a stream in Newton County in the U.S. state of Missouri. It is a tributary of Shoal Creek.

The stream flows generally north-northwest for about two miles passing about one mile east of Spurgeon before turning to the northeast. It continues to its confluence with Shoal Creek about one half mile southeast of Tipton Ford after passing under U.S. Route 71.

Cedar Creek was so named due to the cedar timber near its banks.

See also
List of rivers of Missouri

References

Rivers of Newton County, Missouri
Rivers of Missouri